The Canton of Mont-Louis is a French former canton of the Pyrénées-Orientales department, in the Languedoc-Roussillon region. It had 3,970 inhabitants (2012). It was disbanded following the French canton reorganisation which came into effect in March 2015. It consisted of 15 communes, which joined the new canton of Les Pyrénées catalanes in 2015.

The canton comprised the following communes:

Mont-Louis 
Les Angles
Bolquère
La Cabanasse
Caudiès-de-Conflent
Fontpédrouse
Fontrabiouse
Formiguères
La Llagonne
Matemale
Planès
Puyvalador
Réal
Saint-Pierre-dels-Forcats
Sauto

References

Mont-Louis
2015 disestablishments in France
States and territories disestablished in 2015